Rare Tea Company Ltd. ("Rare Tea Co.") is a direct trade tea sourcing, distribution and online retail company. Founded by Henrietta Lovell in 2004, the company is based in London.

History 

Rare Tea Company began in London and now supplies and collaborates with many of the world's finest chefs and restaurants, including Noma in Copenhagen, Momofuku in New York and Claridge's in London. Rare Tea Co. retails globally from China to Waitrose and online.

Product 

Rare Tea Company imports and exports loose leaf tea and herbs. These are bought via direct trade relationships with farmers in China, Japan, India, Nepal, Sri Lanka, Mexico and the UK. They also provide tea ware and collaborate with British ceramicists.

Rare Tea Co. is renowned for creating bespoke blends, including Royal Ascot, Fergus Henderson and Noma.

Awards 

Best Independent Retailer 2009 - Observer Food Monthly.

References

Further reading

 "Storming the Teacup", Time Magazine Wednesday, 14 January 2009
 "Market Leader Interview - Henrietta Lovell", Creative Brief
 "Tried and tested: an artisan tea", The Daily Telegraph
"In Business: why kindness can help business grow", BBC News
"The Inventory: Henrietta Lovell", The Financial Times, 29 November 2013
"The Menu, episode 154", Monocle Radio 26 September 2014

External links

Companies based in the London Borough of Islington
Tea companies of the United Kingdom